This article displays the squads for the 1994 UEFA European Under-21 Championship. Only players born on or after 1 January 1971 were eligible to play. Players in bold have later been capped at full international level.

Czechoslovakia

Head coach: Ivan Kopecký

Source:

France

Head coach: Raymond Domenech

Source:

Greece

Source:

Italy

Head coach: Cesare Maldini

Source:

Poland

Head coach: Wiktor Stasiuk

Source:

Portugal

Head coach: Nelo Vingada

Source:

Russia

Head coach: Boris Ignatyev

Source:

Spain

Head coach: Andoni Goikoetxea

Source:

References

UEFA European Under-21 Championship squads
1994 UEFA European Under-21 Championship